Siniša Mali (born 25 August 1972) is a Serbian economist and politician serving as Deputy Prime Minister of Serbia since 2022 and as Minister of Finance since 2018. A member of the Serbian Progressive Party (SNS), he previously served as Mayor of Belgrade from 2014 to 2018, and as the president of the Temporary Council of Belgrade from 2013 to 2014.

The discovery of plagiarism in Mali's doctoral dissertation was one of the triggers for the anti-government protests leading to the 12-day students' blockade of the university's main building and the decision of the University of Belgrade to revoke his doctorate.

Early life and education
Siniša Mali was born on 25 August 1972, in Belgrade. He graduated from the primary and secondary school – the 5th Belgrade Grammar School. In 1995, he completed his undergraduate studies, while in 1998 he received his master's degree at the Faculty of Economics, University of Belgrade. During the undergraduate studies, Mali received the award as the student of the generation, and after completing his studies, he received the award for the best undergraduate dissertation.

He enrolled in doctoral studies in 2020, "Finance" study program, at the Technical University in Košice, Slovakia. In August 2022, he passed the dissertation exam, which approves the topic for his doctoral thesis.

As a Ron Brown scholar, in 1999, he received his master's degree in finance (Master of Business Administration) from the Washington University in St. Louis, United States of America. During the studies, Mali worked as an assistant on five courses in the field of business finance. After studying, Mali received the award as the best student in the field of finance, as well as the award for being among the top 10 students of the top 20 business schools in the United States that year.

Business career
Prior to his political career, Mali was a financial adviser in the private sector. He worked in several private companies that were engaged in advising in the field of financial services. Between 1995 and 1997, Mali worked for Deloitte &Touche in Belgrade, and in its Prague office from 1999 to 2001. During his stay in the United States, he worked at Credit Suisse First Boston in the Mergers & Acquisitions Group in New York City.

In 2001, he was appointed as the Assistant Minister of Privatisation in the Ministry of Economy and Privatisation. During his tenure, Mali was in charge of the execution of the privatisation process in the Republic of Serbia and preparation of the various laws in this field. At the end of that year, he moved to the Privatisation Agency, where he was the director of the Centre for Tender Privatisation. He remained in that position until the end of 2003.

From 2005 to 2008, Mali was the chairman of the real estate company "NCA Investment Group Doo Beograd".

Mali has served as a chairman of several boards of directors, including Fiat Automobil Srbija and Komercijalna banka, as well as chairman of the Supervisory Committee of Air Serbia. Additionally, he was a chairman of the Organising Committee of the 2017 European Athletics Indoor Championships in Belgrade and the 2018 EuroLeague Final Four.

He is the Chartered Financial Analyst (CFA) and member of CFA Institute, Serbian Business Angels Network, Fulbright Alumni Association of Serbia, British-Serbian Business Club, as well as a member of the Golf Club Belgrade and a holder of a golf green card. Also, he is the holder of the portfolio manager license, issued by the Serbian Securities Commission.

Mali's private business was being investigated by the Serbian Administration for the Prevention of Money Laundering (APML) in 2016. Earlier, during 2015, the Organized Crime and Corruption Reporting Project (OCCRP) and Serbian investigative journalism outlet KRIK discovered that Mali controls 42 bank accounts, registered under himself, his wife, and his three underage children. These accounts were holding sums of money far exceeding his official salary. In addition, OCCRP/KRIK discovered and reported his purchase of 24 apartments on Bulgarian Black Sea coast in 2012 and 2013. APML suspected Mali's accounts and apartment purchases as a money-laundering scheme and reported it to the Higher Public Prosecutor's Office in Belgrade. The prosecutors dismissed the case, as they did not find evidence of criminal activity and therefore rejected to launch an investigation. On 3 October 2021, when the Pandora Papers documents were released, it was confirmed that Mali "definitely owned 24 apartments in Bulgaria". The Pandora Papers discovered the missing link that Mali was indeed the owner of the two offshore companies that owned 24 apartments in Bulgaria. Mali responded by claiming that "it is a lie". The minister also stated that he does not own 24 apartments, but only one that is properly registered and where he has been vacationing with his family for ten years. The prosecution remained passive, however, and despite Mali’s previous rejections of these accusations, Prime Minister Ana Brnabić claimed that this case does not constitute corruption as it occurred before he entered politics. Yet Mali was, indeed, a public official at that time and did not report the properties as obliged by law.

Political career
In 2012, Mali was appointed as the advisor for economic affairs to the First Deputy Prime Minister Aleksandar Vučić. A year later, Mali was appointed as the Chief Negotiator with investors from the United Arab Emirates. He conducted negotiations on a strategic partnership between the then state-owned company JAT and Etihad Airways that resulted in the establishment of Air Serbia.

Mayor of Belgrade 
Following the ousting of Mayor Dragan Đilas in November 2013, Mali was appointed as the President of the Temporary Council of Belgrade. After the 2014 election in Belgrade, Mali was elected as a Mayor on the proposal of the winning Serbian Progressive Party.

From the very first moment of his appointment in 2014, Mali initiated a comprehensive financial consolidation program in order to achieve sustainable fiscal stabilisation. During his tenure as the Mayor of Belgrade, Mali managed to halve the debt of the city of Belgrade, which in 2014 amounted to 1.2 billion euros, and to reduce the budget deficit by four times. Mali conducted a debt consolidation of public utility companies, which in the first three years of his tenure resulted in the net profit of 9.5 billion dinars. He managed to galvanize a significant number of investments’ projects that contributed to low unemployment. The most significant is the new hub project “Belgrade Waterfront” (total worth 3.5 billion euros), the opening of the first IKEA store and Hilton Hotels & Resorts’ brand in Serbia, as well as the opening of the Chinese automotive parts’ factory MEI TA Europe Ltd. During Mali's tenure, Moody's Public Sector Europe (MPSE) upgraded the City of Belgrade's long-term issuer rating to Ba3 from B1; the rating's outlook has been changed to stable from positive.

Mali's tenure as the Mayor of Belgrade was marked with numerous significant infrastructure projects such as completion of the Pupin Bridge over the river Danube, Košare's heroes Boulevard, water factory "Makiš 2", as well as the complete reconstruction of Slavija Square, Boulevard of Liberation, Roosevelt Street and Mije Kovačević Street. The railway station "Belgrade Center" (Prokop) started to operate after 40 years. The projects of expansion of the pedestrian zone in the city of Belgrade and facade restoration were initiated. Agreements were signed for the construction of a waste processing plant in Vinča, wastewater treatment plants in Veliko Selo and for the construction of the Obrenovac - Novi Beograd heating plant.

Minister of Finance 
On 29 May 2018, he was appointed as the Minister of Finance of the Republic of Serbia in the cabinet of Ana Brnabić, after the resignation of Dušan Vujović three weeks earlier.

At the beginning of his tenure as the Minister of Finance, Mali has emphasised the two main goals; maintenance of the macroeconomic stability and achievement of the greater economic growth. In the first year of his tenure, the new set of laws has been passed with the aim to contribute to a better economic environment, reduce the tax burden on labour, incentive beginners in business, increase pensions and public sector salaries and the modernize Tax Administration.

On 4 July 2019, Mali was appointed as the president of the Coordination Body for Combat against Money laundering and Terrorism financing, where he replaced the Deputy Prime Minister and Minister of Interior Nebojša Stefanović. Concurrently, he was appointed as the Governor of the Republic of Serbia at the Asian Infrastructure Investment Bank (AIIB).

Mali held the position of a member of the Presidency of the Serbian Progressive Party until November 2021, when he was elected as one of the vice presidents of the party.

PhD thesis controversy 

Mali submitted his thesis at the Faculty of Economics in Belgrade, in 2002. Titled Privatization by the Method of Enterprises Selling - Theoretical Concepts and the Case of Serbia it was rejected in 2011 on the basis of low quality and lack of scientific value. He then modified it and submitted it to the Faculty of Organizational Sciences (FON) as the Value Creation through the Process of Restructuring and Privatisation – Theoretical Concepts and the Case of Serbia, where he obtained his PhD in 2013. On 9 July 2014 the website "Peščanik" claimed that Mali had plagiarized at least one third of his PhD thesis. Professor Raša Karapandža showed that Mali plagiarized his thesis with the content from other theses, authored articles, site of the Agency of Privatization of Serbia and Wikipedia by publishing several examples. The main plagiarised source was the doctorate of professor Stifanos Hailemariam, an economist from Eritrea, titled Corporate Value Creation, Governance and Privatisation: Restructuring and Managing Enterprises in Transition – The Case of Eritrea, defended at the University of Groningen in The Netherlands, in 2001.

The FON founded the commission which in October 2014 concluded that Mali's work is not a plagiarism. University rejected this decision on 10 December 2014. In November 2016 the FON formed new Ethics Commission. On 19 December 2016 it again concluded that there is no plagiarism. On 18 January 2017, citing procedural reasons, the university rejected theses findings, too. The FON failed to form the new commission until February 2019 which concluded that only 6.97% of the thesis was plagiarized, which the commission claimed is not enough to dispute its scientific contribution. On 15 July the university again returned the decision back to the FON for new deliberation, giving them 60 days to do so, stating that commission's findings were "incomplete, unclear and contradictory". The FON formed the same commission as in January, which on 23 October 2019 submitted the same report. On 21 November 2019, university's Professional Ethics Board overturned the faculty's decision and unanimously confirmed the non-academic behavior of Mali. On 12 December 2019, the Senate of the university unanimously annulled Mali's doctorate due to plagiarism. However, the Administrative Court in Belgrade invalidated the decision of the Committee for Professional Ethics of the University of Belgrade, which annulled the Minister of Finance Siniša Mali's doctorate, according to the court's ruling in June 2021. The case was returned to the competent authority for reconsideration. The explain for such verdict, among other things, is that the decision of the Board which challenged the doctorate was not made in accordance with the acts of the university. The decision refers to the technical and procedural errors only, without judging the plagiarism itself. However, Professional Ethics Committee of the University of Belgrade admitted that the procedure in case of Minister Siniša Mali's doctorate was illegal. Namely, the President of the Board of the University of Belgrade Vuk Radović rejected the appeal of the rector Ivanka Popović against the decision of the Scientific-Teaching Council of the Faculty of Organizational Sciences as inadmissible.

Due to the scandal outbreak, Mali was never promoted to the rank of the doctor of philosophy. Still, on the electoral list for the 2018 Belgrade elections, he even named "doctor of philosophy" as his "occupation". It also coincided with the period of exponential growth of doctorates in Serbia, from 205 in 2007 to 2,012 in 2016. The case has been often compared, unfavorably though, to the Guttenberg plagiarism scandal of Karl-Theodor zu Guttenberg, German Minister of Defense who resigned his post after the plagiarism was revealed. While in Guttenberg's case political epilogue came after 20 days and a legal one after 9 months, scandal with Mali's doctorate dragged on for 6 calendar years while he ultimately progressed in the political hierarchy.

During this period, question of Mali's doctorate crossed the lines of academia becoming a political affair and a much wider social issue in Serbia due to the inactivity of the state and educational institutions regarding this matter, which in turn provoked public protests, university's blockade by the students and a fierce public and political division. Students blocked the Rectorate of University of Belgrade for a day on 19 July 2019, asking for plagiarism to be declared. Since the issue wasn't resolved, they again blocked it from 13 to 25 September 2019. Mali was vehemently defended by the entire governing and party establishment in what was described as the operation "defend and protect plagiarism" with the entire "machinery employed to defend the doctorate". On the other side, this triggered protests and public performances calling for the annulment of Mali's doctorate which ultimately blended into the wider civil and political Serbian protests since 2018. This was enhanced by the perception of his tenure as the mayor of Belgrade, which was described as the "deluge of affairs" while Mali himself was labeled the "walking affair", "controversial" and "scandal-ridden".

The Senate of the University of Belgrade officially annulled his doctorate in December 2021. In June 2022, the Constitutional Court of Serbia decided that certain provisions of the Rulebook on the procedure for determining non-academic behavior in the preparation of written works, which govern the procedures for revocation of the academic title due to the pronounced measure of public condemnation for violations of the Code of Professional Ethics of the University of Belgrade, as well as certain provisions of the Statute of the University of Belgrade - are not in accordance with the Constitution and the law. The already mentioned regulations, which are not in accordance with the Constitution and the law, and jeopardize two fundamental constitutional principles: the rule of law and the prohibition of retroactive effect of laws (retroactivity), are the regulations upon which Siniša Mali's diploma, granting the title of Doctor of Science, was annulled. All of this practically means that Siniša Mali's doctorate should be reinstated to him since the regulations on the basis of which it was taken away from him are not in accordance with the law.

Based on the court's decision, Mali filed a complaint to the university on 22 August 2022, asking for the decision on voiding his doctorate to be revoked. On 25 January 2023, the Senate of the University unanimously voted to reject his appeal as unfounded and to uphold the Board for Professional Ethic's decision. At the Senate's session, rector Vladan Đokić read board's explanation for rejection, saying that "act like plagiarism, which has been proven in this case, cannot become morally acceptable behavior with the passage of time".

Personal life 
Mali is divorced and has two sons and a daughter. He speaks English fluently, uses Greek and is studying Chinese. 

Mali was awarded the "Best European 2014" award for the project of development and reconstruction of Belgrade. In 2017, the European Movement in B&H awarded him with the "Most Tolerant City in the Region" award. Also, Siniša Mali is the Reformer of the Year for 2022. NALED's special award was given to the Minister for the introduction of eFiscalization and eInvoices, systemic reforms that will improve the transparency of financial transactions, tax collection and contribute to the suppression of shadow economy in Serbia.

He is a keen sportsman, and a regular participant in marathon races. In November 2018 he ran the full Athens Marathon and in September next year Mali ran full marathon in Berlin. Also, he ran full marathon in Boston, New York, Chicago, London and Tokyo. By finishing the Tokyo Marathon in March 2023, Sinisa Mali earned the Six Star Medal award.

He was a member of the presidency of KK Crvena zvezda and he is the honorary holder of the black belt in taekwondo 5th dan for contribution to the development of sports. During his high school days, Mali played guitar in a heavy metal band. 

He was awarded the Order of the Great Martyrs of Kragujevac of the first degree. It was handed to him with the blessing of the Serbian Patriarch Irinej, in October 2019, by Bishop of the Diocese of Šumadija, Jovan.

References

External links

1972 births
Living people
Deloitte people
Finance ministers of Serbia
Government ministers of Serbia
KK Crvena Zvezda executives
Mayors of Belgrade
Politicians from Belgrade
Serbian economists
Serbian Progressive Party politicians
University of Belgrade Faculty of Economics alumni
Olin Business School (Washington University) alumni
CFA charterholders
People involved in plagiarism controversies
People named in the Pandora Papers